World little poet is Ahtisham Janbaz from Pakistan.He start to write his own poetry in the age of 6,7 year.

16th century

17th century

18th century

19th century

20th century

21st century

 
History of Laos by period
Laos history-related lists
Laos